7 Seconds (often stylized as 7Seconds) are an American hardcore punk band from Reno, Nevada, that was formed in 1980 by two sets of brothers. The band has gone through numerous lineup changes over the subsequent years, with only Kevin Seconds and Steve Youth remaining constant members.

The current lineup of 7 Seconds consists of Kevin Seconds (vocals), Steve Youth (bass), Troy Mowat (drums), and Bobby Adams (guitar).

History

Formation 
7 Seconds was formed on January 17, 1980, by two sets of brothers; the Marvelli brothers, using the punk rock names "Kevin Seconds" and "Steve Youth", and the Borghino brothers, who were known as "Tom Munist" and "Dim Menace".

Asked about the origins of the band's name in a December 1982 interview with Flipside magazine, Kevin Seconds recalled:

"...I was ordering The Dils single '198 Seconds of The Dils' from Bomp and I wrote it on a desk and the ink it said 97 Seconds; and then we saw this movie Day of the Jackals or something and all through it there were references to 7 Seconds, and the Dils were like our idols... So we were looking for a name and we were looking at this racing book and it said 7 seconds and we said, 'fuck it, must be an omen,' so we picked it. It's a short, intense name."

This story evolved over time. In the February 2005 issue of AMP, in an article titled, "7 Seconds: 25 Years of Our Core", Kevin Seconds told this tale:

"We were big fans of The Dils, they had this EP, 198 Seconds of The Dils and I was so in love with punk rock that I would just write album titles on my clothes. This was still when Steve and I lived with my mom. We had this desk in this room we shared and I wrote '197 seconds of The Dils,' I miswrote the title. Over time, everything else faded, but the 7 Seconds part was there, and I circled it, I thought it looked cool."

In 1981, Munist and Menace left to form a new band called Section 8.

Recording history 
7 Seconds has floated across several genres of rock.

The band's early releases were several EPs including 1982's Skins, Brains and Guts, most of which were later re-released on the alt.music.hardcore and Old School compilation CDs. All three demos were released on a bootleg release named 7 Seconds – Hardcore Rules, 80-82. They also appeared on the 1985 hardcore compilation Cleanse the Bacteria, in addition to numerous other compilations, such as Not So Quiet On the Western Front (Alt. Tentacles, 1982), Something to Believe In (BYO, 1984), Party or Go Home/We Got Power (Mystic, 1983), and Nuke Your Dink (Positive Force, 1984).  They became closely associated with the Straight Edge movement and helped start the Youth Crew movement in 1984 with The Crew.

Their first full-length album, The Crew, was recorded in 1983–84 and released by BYO Records, as was its successor – 1985's EP Walk Together, Rock Together, which was expanded the next year into a full length album with live tracks on the b-side. With the New Wind album, the band dramatically expanded its sound and style with audible elements of a sometimes quieter, slower, more melodic and accessible sound. Many writers have credited this particular period of 7 Seconds' career as being highly influential on many pop punk and indie rock bands that came along much later.

Subsequent LPs moved deeper into mainstream territory with a U2-like sound. The 7 Seconds album continued their musical experimentation. The band broke free in 1995 with The Music, The Message, moving back somewhat into their roots. The Music, The Message was released on Sony (BMI), the first release on a major label throughout the band's history. Earlier material was on various homegrown labels, completely self-produced, or put out on Kevin Seconds own label, Positive Force Records (AKA United Front), before BYO Records housed them. However, the band returned to an old-school hardcore sound in 1999 with the Good to Go album. 2005 came the release of Take It Back, Take It On, Take It Over! on SideOneDummy, completing the evolution back to their Hardcore roots.

Legacy 
7 Seconds is believed to be the first band to refer to themselves primarily as hardcore. After their first show on March 2, 1980, in Newsletter NWIN/SPUNK No. 1 they described their band as hardcore new wave.

Vocalist Kevin Seconds has gone on to have a lengthy solo career, becoming an important folk punk singer too, doing releases with people including Matt Skiba of Alkaline Trio and Mike Scott of Lay It on the Line (band).

Dim Menace's fist-brandishing scowl on the cover of the Skins, Brains, & Guts EP is one of the most iconic images in hardcore.  Sacramento News & Review speaks at length of their influence in the positive hardcore movement and their positive effect on the punk culture.

In May 2013 it was announced that 7 Seconds had signed to Rise Records, with plans to record a new 7" and a full-length album that summer in Sacramento.

Break up 
On March 20, 2018, 7 Seconds announced their breakup via their official Facebook page.

2022 North American Tour 
On October 4, 2021, 7 Seconds announced via Facebook that they will be going on tour in 2022 alongside Circle Jerks (headliner) and Negative Approach (opener). Due to health reasons, longtime drummer Troy Mowat will not be joining the band. His replacement for the tour will be Sammy Siegler (Youth of Today, Judge).

Discography

Demos
Drastic Measures (cassette), 1980
Socially Fucked Up (cassette), 1981
Three Chord Politics (cassette), 1981

EPs
Skins, Brains and Guts (Alternative Tentacles, 1982)
Committed for Life (Squirtdown, 1983)
Blasts from the Past (Positive Force, 1985)
Walk Together, Rock Together (Positive Force/BYO, 1985)
Praise (Positive Force Records, 1987)
1980 Reissue (Official Bootleg, 1991)
Happy Rain/Naked (Eating Blur, 1993)
Split with Kill Your Idols (SideOneDummy, 2004)
My Aim Is You/Slogan On A Shirt (Rise, 2013)

Studio albums 
United We Stand (unreleased and later re-issued as  Old School - Headhunter Records/Cargo Records, 1983)
The Crew (BYO, 1984)
New Wind (Positive Force/BYO, 1986)
Ourselves (Restless, 1988)
Soulforce Revolution (Restless, 1989); No. 153 on the 1989 Billboard 200
Out the Shizzy (Headhunter/Cargo, 1993)
The Music, the Message (Sony/BMI, 1995)
Good to Go (SideOneDummy, 1999)
Take It Back, Take It On, Take It Over! (SideOneDummy, 2005)
Leave a Light On (Rise, 2014)

Compilation albums
Walk Together, Rock Together (Positive Force/BYO, 1986)
alt.music.hardcore (Headhunter/Cargo, 1995)

Live albums
Live! One Plus One (Positive Force/Giant, 1987)
Scream Real Loud...Live! (SideOneDummy, 2000)
Live at Cindy's 1980 (Eyebar Records, 2022)

Compilation appearances
Not So Quiet on the Western Front (MRR/Alternative Tentacles, 1982)
We Got Power: Party or Go Home (Mystic, 1983)
Something to Believe In (BYO, 1984)
Nuke Your Dink (Positive Force, 1984)
Cleanse the Bacteria (Pusmort, 1985)
Another Shot for Bracken (Positive Force, 1986)
Four Bands That Could Change the World (Gasatanka, 1987)
Flipside Vinyl Fanzine, vol. 3 (Flipside, 1987)
Human Polity (One World Communications, 1993)
The Song Retains the Name, vol. 2 (Safe House, 1993)
Ten Years Later (Bossa Nova, 1997)
Short Music for Short People (Fat Wreck Chords, 1999)
Let Them Know: The Story of Youth Brigade and BYO Records (BYO, 2009)
Old School Punk Vol.1 (Walk Together, Rock Together)

References

External links 

"The Subversive History of the Original 7 Seconds"
Kevin Seconds Podcast Radio Show on ipadio

Hardcore punk groups from Nevada
Straight edge groups
Musical quartets
Alternative Tentacles artists
Epic Records artists
BYO Records artists
Rise Records artists
Musical groups established in 1980
Musical groups disestablished in 2018
Musical groups reestablished in 2021
Sibling musical groups
Restless Records artists